Allylescaline (4-allyloxy-3,5-dimethoxyphenethylamine) is a lesser-known psychedelic drug.  It is closely related in structure to mescaline. Allylescaline was first synthesized by Otakar Leminger in 1972. The compound was later synthesized by Alexander Shulgin and further described in his book PiHKAL. The dosage range is listed as 20–35 mg, and the duration 8–12 hours. Allylescaline produces an entactogenic warmth, an entheogenic effect, and a feeling of flowing energy. Very little data exists about the pharmacological properties, metabolism, and toxicity of allylescaline.

Legal status 
Allylescaline is illegal in Sweden as of January 2016.

See also 
 Proscaline
 Methallylescaline
 Elemicin
 3C-AL

References

Psychedelic phenethylamines
Designer drugs
Allyl compounds
Mescalines